Soichiro Minami (born 1975/1976) is a Japanese businessman and billionaire who founded job search and human resources software firm Visional.

He is a graduate of Tufts University with a double major in economics and international relations. Minami lives in Tokyo, Japan.

Forbes lists his net worth as of April 2022 at $1.1 billion USD.

References 

Japanese billionaires
Japanese company founders
21st-century Japanese businesspeople
Living people
Tufts University School of Arts and Sciences alumni
1970s births